__NoTOC__
The 1973 Australian referendum was held on 8 December 1973. It contained two referendum questions.

Results in detail

Prices
This section is an excerpt from 1973 Australian referendum (Prices) § Results

Incomes
This section is an excerpt from 1973 Australian referendum (Incomes) § Results

See also
 Referendums in Australia
Politics of Australia
History of Australia

References

Further reading
  
 .
 Australian Electoral Commission (2007) Referendum Dates and Results 1906 – Present AEC, Canberra.

1973 referendums
1973
Referendum
December 1973 events in Australia